Kolofau (formerly known as Mont de Bougainville) is a mountain in the Wallis and Futuna islands, a French territory in the Pacific Ocean. It is the highest point on Alofi Island.

References 

Landforms of Wallis and Futuna
Mountains of Oceania